Prince of Wales Battery is an artillery battery in the British Overseas Territory of Gibraltar.

Description
The four gun battery was well above the Line Wall Curtain in Gibraltar and defended the southern Jumper's Bastion. This battery was between the similarly armed Lady Augusta's Battery and the Cumberland Flank Battery.

References

Batteries in Gibraltar